Khaled Mahmud Sujon (born 26 July 1971) is a former Bangladeshi cricketer and a former Test and One Day International captain. A medium-pace bowler and middle-order batsman, he played international cricket for Bangladesh from 1998 to 2006, captaining the team from 2003 to 2004. He started his role as Technical Director of Bangladesh National Cricket Team before the tri-series 2018, where Bangladesh, Sri Lanka and Zimbabwe are participators.

Domestic career
He scored his only List A cricket century which was 145* against Bhahawalpur where he along with Minhajul Abedin Nannu set the highest 5th wicket stand in List A cricket history(267*)

International career
Mahmud was born in Dhaka. An all-rounder in domestic cricket, his international success was mostly limited to his bowling in One Day Internationals, peaking with the defeat of Pakistan in the 1999 World Cup, when he scored 27 and took 3 for 31 off 10 overs and won the man of the match award. He took 4 for 37 and 3 for 68 in the Third Test against Pakistan at Multan in 2003–04.

Mahmud retired from international cricket in 2006, scoring a respectable 36 in his final match. He served as the assistant coach of the Bangladesh national cricket team and is now the manager of the team.

Health
In July 2017, he suffered a stroke and was taken to Singapore for treatment.

References

External links

1971 births
Living people
Bangladesh One Day International cricketers
Bangladesh Test cricketers
Bangladesh Test cricket captains
Bangladeshi cricketers
Dhaka Metropolis cricketers
Dhaka Division cricketers
Cricketers at the 1998 Commonwealth Games
Cricketers at the 1999 Cricket World Cup
Cricketers at the 2003 Cricket World Cup
Bangladesh Premier League coaches
Bangladeshi cricket coaches
Cricketers from Dhaka
Commonwealth Games competitors for Bangladesh